Dr. Iulius Iancu (born March 24, 1920, died April 3, 2013) was a Jewish poet and writer writing in Romanian.

Biography
Dr. Iancu Iulius was born on 24 March 1920 in the town of Bacău, in eastern Romania. He spent his childhood according to Jewish traditions. He graduated from Ferdinand I High School in Bacău. He graduated with a degree in medicine from the University of Bucharest in 1949. 
He practised medicine for 50 years as a radiologist, publishing numerous studies and articles in his domain of medicine, some of them quoted in classical manuals.
Between 1999 and 2004, he published the four volumes of his memoir, Noi, Copii Străzii Leca, which was awarded prizes and was praised by a number of political and literary personalities from Israel and abroad.
In 2005, he published his first volume of verse, Poeme De Amurg, which was also appreciated for its literary qualities.
He frequently writes for publications in Israel, Romania, and Canada. Studies about his writings were published in the volumes Scriitori Din Ţara Sfântă by Ion Cristofor, Dicţionar Neconvenţional Al Scriitorilor Evrei De Limba Română by Alexandru Mirodan, Medici, Scriitori Şi Publicişti by Dr. M Mihailide, Bacăul Literar by Eugen Budău and Medici Scriitori by Dr. I. Marton.
Dr. Iulius Iancu is a member of Asociaţia Medicilor Scriitori/ The Association Of The Doctors Writers of Romania, of The 'Haifa' Literary Club and of The 'Şai Agnon' Cultural Club.

Literary career
 Târgul amintirilor (1940) – single copy, lost now
 Poveste naivă (1998) – family edition – exhausted
 Evenimente în desene (2000) – single copy
 "Noi, copiii strazii Leca" Volumes 1–4
 Editura Minimum Israel
 Vol. I – Târgul amintirilor (1999)
 Vol. II – Un om, un drum, o epocă (2001)
 Vol. III – Bacăul de odinioară (2002)
 Vol. IV – Generaţia de la capătul drumului (2005)
 Din jurnalul unui pensionar, written in 2006.
 Poeme de amurg – vol. I (2006)
 Poeme de amurg – vol. II: Aştept ziua de mâine (2007)
 "Printesa din Harduf", a book about facing the Alzheimer's disease. The book was published in Romanian at 2009 and was translated to English by Mariana Zavati Gardner and her daughter.

Magazine publications
 "Viața noastră", Israel, nr.15/2000
 "Semnalul", din Canada, nr.64/2000
 "Minimum", nr.187/2002;
 "Orient Expres", 5 Dec. 2005;
 "Magazin"
 "Jurnalul Săptămânii"

The Princess of Harduf

The Princess of Harduf is a book about survival and understanding, about hope and loss. It is about the journey made by Dr. Iulius Iancu and his wife Rita, shoulder to shoulder through life and ultimately stoically facing her Alzheimer together. The volume is written with immense compassion from the point of view of the doctor and with the deep love of the husband, protector of a vulnerable wife.  
Mixing the diary format with the documentary notes, The Princess of Harduf is written in the first person with the energy of despair at a crescendo pace. It tells the real story of Rita's becoming swamped by Alzheimer and plunging into her own reality with space for one person only, with family and friends locked outside. The narrative reveals how Rita's reality has gradually been stripped away. Dr. Iulius Iancu narrates about his wife's transformation and descent into darkness, from the unnoticed building up of the symptoms and to the obvious.
The emphasis is on the way members of the family and paid help assist Rita. Domestic detail mixes with medical detail. Rita's ongoing transformation is followed by sequences of precise medical notes combined with the deepest emotions. 
The Princess of Harduf is deeply touching as it captures the ability of the human spirit to overcome momentous difficulties.

Works in preparation
 Opinii literare (cărţi şi cărturari)
 Din jurnalul unui pensionar – vol.II
 Despărţiri (poezii)

Awards
 Fundatia 'Sara & Haim Ianculovici' 2001
 Fundatia 'Iacob Groper' 2008

Memberships
 The 'Haifa' Cultural Club
 'Şai Agnon' Cultural Club
 Societatea medicilor scriitori din Romania si Europa

Critical studies
 Ion Cristofor Filipas – Scrisori Din Tara Sfanta
 Al. Mirodan – Dictionar Neconventional Al Scriitorilor Evrei De Limba Romana
 Dr. M. Mihailide – Medici, Scriitori Si Publicisti
 Eugen Budău – Bacaul Literar
 Dr. I. Marton – Medici Scriitori
 Ion Cristofor Filipas – Cetatea Culturala/ Cluj Napoca 2008

Dr. Iulius Iancu's work was included in
 The Muses Visit (album) Ed. Teva 2005
 Ateneul Personalitatilor Bacauane 'Vasile Alecsandri' Bacău (permanent documentary presentation)
 Expozitia Medicilor Desenatori Tel-Aviv 2009
 Yad Vashem (Library – Testimonies)
 Muzeul Evreiesc Bacau – Permanent Display
 A.C.M.E.O.R. Library Tel-Aviv
 The National University Library – Jerusalem
 The Hebrew University Library – Jerusalem
 The 'Eugen Budau' Regional Library – Bacău
 Biblioteca Academiei Romane – București

References

External links (in Romanian)
 Un poet sentimental ION CRISTOFOR
 Aştept ziua de mâine de Cornel Galben
 Poeme de amurg  de Cornel Galben
 Liviu Moscovici primit de la autor bianca marcovici

1920 births
2013 deaths
20th-century Romanian male writers
20th-century Romanian poets
Romanian male poets